John Bolender (March 5, 1837 – June 18, 1902) was an American farmer and politician.

Born in Union County, Pennsylvania, Bolender moved with his parents to Illinois in 1840. He then moved to Juda, Wisconsin. In 1861, Bolender moved to Monroe, Wisconsin and was a farmer. Bolender served as town clerk and village treasurer. Bolender served on the Green County Board of Supervisors and was chairman of the county board. In 1882 and 1883, Bolender served in the Wisconsin State Assembly and was a Republican. Bolender died in Monroe, Wisconsin.

Notes

1837 births
1902 deaths
People from Union County, Pennsylvania
People from Green County, Wisconsin
Farmers from Wisconsin
County supervisors in Wisconsin
Republican Party members of the Wisconsin State Assembly
People from Monroe, Wisconsin
19th-century American politicians